The Honda Eve or Honda Spree or Nifty 50  (NQ50) is a  motor scooter made by Honda in the 1980s. Honda marketed two more models based on the Eve's design. All models utilized a single geared AF05 engine.

Honda Eve Smile
The first variation of the NQ50 was the Honda Eve Smile, and was exclusive to Japan. One of the rare Honda scooter ever made.
 1983: The Eve was available in red for its first year of production.
The bike was missing some vital features, including battery, starter motor, and automatic bystarter. This model also lacked a removable main jet, so tuning was limited without replacing the carburetor with a later model revision. Due to the lack of automatic start, the Eve required a kick start. Eve standard speed can reach up to 60kph and its fuel consumption is 1liter per 83km and Changing tuned bigger carburetor increased its potential speed and more throttle respond and upgrading its ignition spark system can increase its fuel economy.
 1984-1987:  The Eve Pax also gained a battery and starter motor, but retained the manual bystarter control mounted underneath the horn switch. A form of hybrid carburetor containing features from both the Spree/Nifty and the previous Eve, including a removable main jet and a slightly bigger intake. 
Like the Nifty 50, the Eve lacked a dedicated engine stop switch, so the only way to manually stop the engine was to turn the key off. The 1984-87 Eve was available in white, blue, or red.

Honda Spree

Model Differences By Year
 1984: The Spree was available in sparkling red (US Only), cortina white, or vista blue (Canada Only) The speedometer design was slightly different from that used in the 1985-7 Sprees, with speed numbers 10-20-30-40 instead of 5-15-25-35. The logo was also much smaller than later years.
 1985: The Spree logo was much larger than the '84 Sprees, making it more visible. 
 1986: The Spree got a kick starter. Honda also produced a "Special Edition" Spree, in shasta white and lollipop green combo. This Spree is now extremely rare.
 1987: The dashboard, front indicators and tail lamps were redesigned for a more aerodynamic shape. Also a glove box was added behind the shield or front of the scooter, underneath the handlebars and in front of the floorboard.

Iowa Edition
The Iowa Edition Spree was a restricted version that utilized a restricted muffler, smaller main jet and a 12:83 (6.917) gear ratio in order to comply with Iowa laws on the use of mopeds. It was limited in top speed to 25mph. The 1987 Iowa Edition Spree is a very rare model.

Honda Nifty 50

AU
 1984-1987: The Nifty was available in red or dark blue; the latter seems most common. The main visible difference from the Spree is the round headlight and the curved edges of the dashboard.

EU
 1984: The Nifty was available in red or dark blue; The main visible difference from the Spree is the round headlight and the curved edges of the dashboard.  The front headlights are mounted upside down on the underside of the handlebars. The luggage rack is simpler than the Spree's, and the rear lights are mounted either side of the number plate mount rather than on the luggage rack tubing.
 1985: The EU Nifty was identical to the 1984 and '85, with the exceptions of different labels and stickers, and a square red start button rather than a round yellow.

Neither of the Niftys included an engine stop switch above the engine start switch, so the only proper way of stopping the engine was to turn off the ignition.

Spree
Motor scooters
Motorcycles introduced in the 1980s